Poe is the mascot of the Baltimore Ravens of the National Football League (NFL). He is named after the writer and Baltimore, Maryland resident, Edgar Allan Poe.

Poe's brothers

When originally unveiled, Poe was one of three costumed mascots, all raven brothers named "Edgar", "Allan", and "Poe". Because the Baltimore Ravens were named after the poem "The Raven" by Baltimore resident Edgar Allan Poe, it was natural that the team name their mascots after Poe himself. The three not only commemorated the famous Baltimore poet, but also represented three completely different personalities and their stereotypical relation to certain types of NFL players.

According to the back story, Edgar was the first to hatch.  Edgar was tall and broad shouldered, representing the "backfield" or the players of the game routinely not staged on the line of scrimmage.  This represented the linebacker, defensive back, fullback, quarterback, etc.  Edgar was decidedly proud, if not arrogant, and was the leader of the trio.

Allan was particularly shorter and thinner than Edgar and especially Poe, yet much quicker.  He represented the receivers and running backs.  Allan was a very excitable bird who always had energy to spare. 

Poe was the last to hatch.  Poe is short and stout representing the linemen of the game.  He is a slow, lazy, yet lovable mascot.  Poe routinely joins tailgate parties in his never-ending search for the perfect cheeseburger.

After the 2008 season ended, Edgar and Allan were retired, leaving Poe as the sole mascot of the Baltimore Ravens. For the 2009 season, Poe was joined by two real live ravens, "Rise" and "Conquer".

After Poe suffered an injury in a halftime event during a preseason game, Edgar and Allan were brought out of retirement for the 2022 season.  Poe returned in week 17 of that season against the Steelers.

References

National Football League mascots
Bird mascots